Mary Anderson (born January 20, 1939) is an American author of mystery novels for children and young adults, the majority published by Atheneum Books of  New York City.

Bibliography
There's a pizza back in Cleveland (1972; with Hope Campbell), Four Winds Press
Emma's Search for Something (1973), Atheneum Books
Matilda Investigates (1973), Atheneum Books
Just the two of them (1974), Atheneum Books
I'm nobody! Who are you? (1974), Atheneum Books
F*T*C Superstar (1976), Atheneum Books
Matilda's Masterpiece (1977), Atheneum Books Soft Cover Title: "The Mystery of the Missing Painting" 
Step on a Crack (1978), Atheneum Books
F*T*C* and Company (1979; with Don Sibley), Atheneum Books
Contributor, THE NEW YORK KIDS BOOK,  1979, Doubleday
THE ORPHAN PRINCESS, 1978, (LIBRETTO) TheatreWorks, (Formerly P.A.R.T)
The Rise & Fall of a Teen-age Wacko (1980), Atheneum Books
Forever, Ahbra (1981), Atheneum Books
You can't get there from Here (1982), Atheneum Books
R.I.S.K. (1983), Atheneum Books
That's not my style (1983), Atheneum Books
Tune in Tomorrow (1984), Atheneum Books
Catch Me, I'm Falling in Love (1985), Delacorte Press
Who says nobody's perfect? (1987), Delacorte Press
Do you call that a dream date? (1987), Delacorte Press
Mostly Ghosts (series; 1987), Yearling Books
MOSTLY MONSTERS (series, 1989) ((Yearling Books))
Suzy's Secret Snoop Society (1991), Avon Books
The Unsinkable Molly Malone (1991)
EVERYDAY WOMEN, New Jersey Repertory Company, July 1999 ((The Cultural Arts Center, Brick Township))
JUNE ROBOT CLEANS UP, 2004, ((Macmillan McGraw- Hill)) Grade One Reader
THE SHARERS, (author title under M.N. QUIRK) ((Triumph Publishing, a division of Mama’s House Press, 2019)) BIOGRAPHICAL LISTING: SOMETHING ABOUT THE AUTHOR, VOLUME 23 (GALE publishing)

References

External links 

 

American children's writers
1939 births
Living people
American women novelists
20th-century American novelists
20th-century American women writers